Steven Sherlock (born 28 March 1997) is an Irish Gaelic footballer who plays for Cork Senior Championship club St Finbarr's and is a former member of the Cork senior football team. He usually lines out as a left corner-forward.

Career
Sherlock first came to Gaelic football prominence at juvenile and underage levels with the St Finbarr's club. After making his senior team debut in 2015, he was part of the club's Munster Club Championship-winning team in 2022. Sherlock first appeared on the inter-county scene as a member of the Cork minor football team in 2015 before later lining out in the 2016 All-Ireland under-21 final defeat by Mayo. He played League and Championship for the Cork senior football team across 2018 and 2019, but was among a small cohort of players cut from then manager Ronan McCarthy's squad at the end of the latter season.

Career statistics

Club

Inter-county

Honours
St Finbarr's
Munster Senior Club Football Championship: 2021
Cork Premier Senior Football Championship: 2018, 2021
Cork Minor Football Championship: 2015

Cork
Munster Under-21 Football Championship: 2016

References

External link
Steven Sherlock profile at the Cork GAA website

1997 births
Living people
St Finbarr's Gaelic footballers
Cork inter-county Gaelic footballers